Gufo (foaled February 28, 2017) is an American multiple Grade I turf winning Thoroughbred racehorse. His Grade I wins include the Belmont Derby in 2020 at Belmont Park and winning the Sword Dancer Stakes at Saratoga Race Course in 2021 and 2022.

Background
Gufo is a chestnut horse who was bred in Kentucky by John Little & Stephen Cainelli, a son of Declaration of War out of the Petionville mare Floy, who also produced millionaire and multiple graded stakes winner Hogy (Grade III Canadian Turf Stakes). Sire Declaration of War was relocated to stand at Japan Bloodhorse Breeders' Association Shizunai Stallion Station and stood for ¥2,300,000 in 2020. Gufo is owned by Otter Bend Stables and trained by Christophe Clement.

Career highlights
As a two-year-old in 2019 Gufo had two starts finishing third in a Maiden Special Weight event at Aqueduct and then following up breaking his maiden at Gulfstream Park.

After winning two more events in July 2020 Gufo won his first Graded stakes event, the GIII Kent Stakes at Delaware Park breaking the track record for the -mile distance.

Gufo was entered NYRA Turf Trinity events Saratoga Derby Invitational Stakes and the Belmont Derby which was moved to a later date in 2020 due to the COVID-19 pandemic in the United States. Gufo finished second to the British-bred Domestic Spending in the Saratoga Derby but then turned the table in the Belmont Derby capturing his first Grade I event.

In 2021 as a four-year-old Gufo ran well at the highest levels at Belmont Park finishing second in the Grade I Man o' War Stakes to Channel Cat by the shortest of margins (a nose) and then third in the Manhattan Stakes again to Domestic Spending after settling last and finishing wide beaten by four lengths. Later in the summer Gufo captured his second Grade I event at Saratoga in the Sword Dancer Stakes with a game victory over British-bred and trained Japan by a neck. Gufo finished the season with a third as the 9/5 favorite in the GI Joe Hirsch Turf Classic and tenth in the Breeders' Cup Turf at Del Mar.

In his first start as a five-year-old Gufo returned to the winner's circle with a comfortable two-length victory in the GII Pan American Stakes  at Gulfstream Park. Gufo followed the same path as he had in 2021 running unsuccessfully in the Man o' War Stakes finishing second to the longshot Irish-bred Highland Chief in a small field of five and once again finishing third in the Manhattan Stakes. Returning to Saratoga Gufo showed his preference for the longer distance Sword Dancer Stakes and displayed a strong finish to win the event for the second time. In his next start Gufo was beaten by a nose in the GII Kentucky Turf Cup at Kentucky Downs as the 8/5 favorite. On October 8, ran in the Grade I Joe Hirsch Turf Classic at Aqueduct. Gufo settled on the outside in the three to four path without the benefit of the cover, came under urging with three furlongs to run, turned into upper stretch under a drive and failed to rally finishing last in a field of seven won by War Like Goddess.

Statistics 

Legend:

 
 

Notes:

An (*) asterisk after the odds means Gufo was the post-time favorite.

Pedigree

References

2017 racehorse births
Racehorses bred in Kentucky
Racehorses trained in the United States
Thoroughbred family 21-a
American Grade 1 Stakes winners
Horse racing track record setters